Sarkani may refer to:

Sirkanay District, Konar Province, Afghanistan
Sarkaņi parish, Latvia